Demyanov (Демьянов) is a Russian patronymic surname (from Демьян, Damian). Notable people with the surname include:

Mikhail Demyanov
Nikolay Demyanov

A similar Ukrainian surname is Demyanyuk or Dem'yanyuk or Demjanjuk.

Russian-language surnames
Patronymic surnames
Surnames from given names